Teacup Travels is a British children's drama TV series. The show was created and produced by PlumFilms with support from Creative Scotland and first shown on CBeebies on 9 February 2015.

The concept of the series is historical fiction for young children, incorporating historical artefacts into dramatic adventure stories. At the time of filming, all the artefacts featured in the show were held in museum collections around the UK.

Concept 

Great Aunt Lizzie tells tales of adventure to entertain her young visitors, Charlotte, Lokesh and Elliot. When either one arrives at the house she offers them a cup of tea, but first they have to choose a teacup from her vast collection which she keeps in an enormous dresser in the kitchen. Each cup is unique and illustrated with one of the museum artefacts. As she begins to tell its story, they begin to imagine being there as the tale unfolds.

Kay Benbow, then the Controller of CBeebies, said, "This is a first for CBeebies to bring ancient history and archaeology to our young audience. The series combines story telling with high adventure in a way that will inspire and encourage children to want to learn more about life in ancient times. I think children will love going on the adventures with Charlotte [and Elliot or Lokesh] to discover more about what life was like thousands of years ago."

Key cast 
Gemma Jones as Great Aunt Lizzie
Evie Brassington as Charlotte
Roderick Gilkison as Elliot (series 1)
Kemaal Deen-Ellis as Lokesh (Series 2)

Series one 
Series one sees Charlotte and her brother Elliot having adventures in Ancient Rome, Imperial China, Ancient Egypt and the pre-medieval Celtic lands, spanning a period from 2500 BCE to 1850 CE. 

These 15-minute episodes are regularly repeated on CBeebies and featured on BBC iPlayer.

Series two 
Charlotte returns for the second series, and introduces the viewers to her cousin Lokesh. Their adventures take them to the fascinating words of Edo Japan, Ancient Greece, the Mayan Empire, and the Viking Lands.
Series two was initially split with 10 new episodes premiering from 28 November 2016, and the 10 episodes transmitting from 2 January 2017. Since going on air, the series has already enjoyed a number of repeats.

Production

Development 
Micky MacPherson, Simon Parsons and Tony Bibby have backgrounds in TV commercial production, advertising, and children's TV. Producers MacPherson and Parsons developed the format for the series, drawing inspiration from Bibby's real aunt whom he used to visit in Liverpool as a child. The producers added the extra dimension of enchanting storytelling wrapped around a genuine historical artefact, with Plum Film's Production Executive Tina Foster, and Development Consultant Becky Lloyd both attached to the project from early development to series production. Series one and two are directed by Simon Hynd, with Morag McKinnon directing the Mayan episodes in series two. Digital Production Designer John Gosler, directed and hand painted the unique background artwork, with children's television writer Polly Churchill taking the role of Head Writer for both series, overseeing all 45 episodes.

A key addition to the team was Production Designer Leslie Dilley, a double Academy Award Winner for Star Wars and Raiders of the Lost Ark.

Museum involvement 
A key element of the show is its involvement with museums across the length and breadth of the United Kingdom. Plum Films consulted museums at key stages of production to ensure that the real artefacts that inspired Great Aunt Lizzie's stories reflected its core truths. Where possible, Plum Films representatives visited the museum to capture the dimensions and likeness of the object to be featured in the show. This aided the prop makers to replicate the prop, which would then be presented to each associated museum's curator for notes and approval. Similarly, script outlines were shared with each associated museum to give the all clear that the episode represented a satisfactory representation of their piece.

Filming 
The TV show is a combination of full live action for the prologue and epilogue scenes in Great Aunt Lizzie's house, and live action filmed against green screen then composited with colour saturated 2½d illustrated backgrounds for the story world.

Locations 
Filmed entirely in Scotland, the sets were created in Loretto School, Musselburgh, while outdoor scenes featuring Great Aunt Lizzie's iconic cottage were filmed at the Head Gardener's Cottage in Princes Street Gardens, Edinburgh.

Distribution (Non-UK) 
The first series of Teacup Travels was shown in Australia on ABC Kids in the summer of 2016. The show has reached Number 1 in the ratings and continues to be repeated on the channel.

Music 
The soundtrack for series one and two was composed by Rasmus Borowski and Alexius Tschallener. The score was recorded live in Prague, Czech Republic, with the City of Prague Philharmonic Orchestra and Nic Raine conducting.

Training 
A stepping-up programme was created in partnership with Creative Skillset especially for Series Two with the aim of giving two emerging production talents – Catrina Rose and Gabriel Costa – an opportunity to work across the entire production process from early stages through to delivery. Plum Films' Training through Production Scheme was funded by Creative Skillset's Skills Investment Fund with the aim of up-skilling talent to ensure a strong, skilled creative workforce.

CBeebies Storytime App 
On 24 April 2017 the CBeebies Storytime App launched an originally written and built story titled 'Charlotte and the Viking Coins' based on an object that has not been previously seen on the show. The story is narrated by Great Aunt Lizzie, and Charlotte follows an adventure based on real Viking coins that can be found in various museums throughout the UK. The App gives children an interactive storytelling experience, allowing them to engage in reading in a fun and exciting way. The App offers the child to read alone or with a grown-up, as well as providing questions at the end to allow further story discussion and engagement.

Reception

Ratings 
In its debut week of 9 February 2015, the show placed three times in the top 10 viewed shows on CBeebies, peaking at 561,000 viewers.

Award Nominations 

The first series of Teacup Travels has received various nominations, both in the UK and abroad

 BAFTA Scotland (2015 ) – Best Children's Programme 
 Broadcast Awards (2016) – Best Pre-School Programme 2015/2016
 Celtic Media Festival (2016) – Children's Programme
 Prix Jeunesse International (2016) – Children's Fiction, 6 years and under

References

External links 
 

Website of composer Rasmus Borowski 

2010s British children's television series
2015 British television series debuts
2017 British television series endings
BBC children's television shows
British preschool education television series
Television shows set in Scotland
CBeebies